The 2015 Hockey India League (known as the Hero Hockey India League for sponsorship reasons), abbreviated as HIL 2015, was the third season of the professional field hockey tournament, Hockey India League. The tournament began on 22 January 2015 with the final on 22 February 2015.

Ranchi Rays and Dabang Mumbai debuted in this season. The prize money for this edition was announced to be 2.5 Crores INR. Ranchi Rays emerged the champions of the season after beating Punjab Warriors in the final.

Teams

Results

League phase

First to fourth place classification

Semi-finals

Third and fourth place

Final

See also
List of Hockey India League players
World Series Hockey

References

External links
Official website

  
Hockey India League seasons
India
Hockey